The Beautiful Girl is a 1923 German silent film directed by Max Mack and starring Hella Moja, Fritz Richard and Ilka Grüning.

The film's sets were designed by the art director Carl Ludwig Kirmse.

Cast
Hella Moja as Gött's daughter
Fritz Richard as old Gött
Ilka Grüning as Frau Gött
Walter Rilla as Franz, Gött's son
Margit Barnay as Gött's daughter
Rudolf Klein-Rhoden as Wyslicenus
Ernst Pröckl as Student Kunze
Heinz Salfner as Prof. Wessely
Alfred Haase as Baron von Riemer
Ludwig Hartau as Rubiner, department store owner
Dora Bergner as Frau Rubiner, his wife
Hermann Blaß as Balduin, photograph
Fred Immler as gentleman
Ludwig Rex as doctor
Hermann Picha as antiquearian

References

External links

Films of the Weimar Republic
Films directed by Max Mack
German silent feature films
German black-and-white films